The Grupo Poéticas Digitais (Digital Poetics Group) is a multidisciplinary center that promotes the development of experimental projects and the reflection about the impact of the new technologies in the field of arts.

It was created in 2002 in the Fine Art's Department of University of São Paulo (USP), as an offshoot of wAwRwT project initiated by Gilbertto Prado in 1995.

The Group has as participants professors, artists, researchers and undergraduate and postgraduate students, working in different compositions in each project.

Projects 
 Encontros (2012)
 Catavento (2011)
 Amoreiras (2010)
 Desluz (2009)
 Pedralumen (2009)
 Cozinheiro das Almas (2006)
 Incógnito (2007)
 Acaso 30 (2005)

Participants 
Take part of the group in 2014: 
 
 Gilbertto Prado
 Agnus Valente
 Claudio Bueno
 Ellen Nunes
 Leonardo Lima
 Maria Luiza Fragoso
 Maurício Trentin
 Nardo Germano
 Andrei Thomaz
 Luciana Ohira
 Renata La Rocca
 Sérgio Bonilha

Among the participants that had collaborated in different moments are: 
 
 André Kishimoto
 Camila Torrano
 Clarissa Ribeiro
 Daniel Ferreira
 Fabio Oliveira Nunes
 Fernando Iazzetta
 Gaspar Arguello
 Lívia Gabbai
 Lucila Meirelles
 Luiz Bueno Geraldo
 Mauricio Taveira
 Paula Gabbai
 Raul Cecílio Jr.
 Soraya Braz
 Tatiana Travisani
 André Furlan
 Elaine de Oliveira Nunes
 Francisco Serpa
 Jesus de Paula Assis
 José Dario Vargas
 Karina Yamamoto
 Luciana Kawasaki
 Helia Vannuchi
 Luciano Gosuen
 Luis Henrique Moraes
 Marcos Cuzziol
 Mônica Ranciaro
 Monica Tavares
 Natália Gagliardi
 Paula Janovitch
 Rafael Rodrigues de Souza
 Ricardo Irineu de Souza
 Rodolfo Leão
 Silvia Laurentiz
 Silvio Valinhos da Silva
 Tânia Fraga
 Val Sampaio
 Viviam Schmaichel

References 
 Grupo Poéticas Digitais. http://www.poeticasdigitais.net. Retrieved on July 10, 2014.
 Renata Schmidt. Escola de Comunicação e Artes - Universidade de São Paulo: Grupo Poéticas Digitais expõe trabalho na Av. Paulista. Retrieved on July 10, 2014.
 Fórum Permanente: Galeria expandida. Retrieved on July 10, 2014.
  Emoção Art.ficial 5.0: Autonomia Cibernética. Retrieved on July 10, 2014.
 Vera Diegoli. Repórter ECO - TV Cultura: Meio Ambiente é um dos destaques da Bienal de Arte e Tecnologia. Retrieved on July 10, 2014.

2002 establishments in Brazil
Poetry organizations
Organizations established in 2002
Brazilian writers' organisations